Ohad Buzaglo (born 9 January 1982) is a former Israeli footballer turned football manager.

Personal life
Buzaglo is the son of Hani and Jacob Buzaglo- a former player who played in the 70's and 80's in Hapoel Tel Aviv, Beitar Jerusalem and Hapoel Jerusalem. His younger brothers are the footballers Asi Buzaglo, Maor Buzaglo and Almog Buzaglo. Buzaglo is divorced, and has 4 children from his marriage.

References

External links
 

1982 births
Living people
Israeli Sephardi Jews
Israeli footballers
Israeli football managers
Hapoel Jerusalem F.C. players
Maccabi Ramat Amidar F.C. players
Hakoah Maccabi Amidar Ramat Gan F.C. players
Hapoel Jerusalem F.C. managers
Sektzia Ness Ziona F.C. managers
F.C. Kafr Qasim managers
Israeli people of Moroccan-Jewish descent
Association football midfielders
Footballers from Holon
Israeli Mizrahi Jews
Survivor (Israeli TV series) contestants